Ramit may refer to:

Given name
Notable people with this given name include:
 Ramit Tandon, Indian squash player
 Ramit Sethi, American entrepreneur

Other
 Ramit State Nature Reserve, Tajikistan